Alphaxard Kangi Ndege Lugola (born 25 May 1963) was a Tanzanian politician and current Member of Parliament for Mwibara constituency since 2010. He is also  member of the ruling party Chama Cha Mapinduzi (CCM).

Background and education
Kangi Alpaxard Lugola started his inclination process to schooling at Nyamitwebili Primary School from 1974 to 197, between 1978 and 1978 at Mugeta Primary School as he studied for one year before moved to Kavunjo Primary School where he completed his standard seven Education and being titled with PSLE that was between 1979 and 1980. In 1981 to 1984 he joined the Sengerema Secondary School until his completion the O level Education and to be awarded a CSEE but also in 1985 to 1987 he succeeded to complete his Advance Certificate of Secondary Education Examination at Songea Boys Secondary School. He joined the UDSM starting from 1988 to 1992 where awarded a certificate of bachelor's degree, and between  1987 to 1990 of Kangi Alpaxard Lugola join the University of Leicester in London and being awarded with a certificate of post graduate degree.

Political career

References

1963 births
Living people
Chama Cha Mapinduzi MPs
Tanzanian MPs 2010–2015
Sengerema Secondary School alumni
Songea Boys Secondary School alumni
University of Dar es Salaam alumni
Tanzanian Roman Catholics